Thomas Vigh Jr. (born November 27, 1964) is an American professional stock car racing driver. He currently competes part-time in the ARCA Menards Series and ARCA Menards Series East, driving the No. 12 for Fast Track Racing. He previously competed part-time for the team in 2018 and full-time in 2019, both in the team's No. 10 car. In 2019, he was the Rookie of the Year award winner.

Racing career
Vigh began his racing career on local dirt tracks prior to racing in ARCA. He started racing in 1996, competing in street stock racing events, and soon after in pro stock and sportsman races as well, finishing fifth in the OCFS Sportsman Series standings in 2018.

He made his first three ARCA starts for Andy Hillenburg's Fast Track Racing team, driving their No. 10 car at Madison as well as the two dirt races at Springfield and DuQuoin with sponsorship from Extreme Kleaner. He got top-15 finishes in each race, with a 15th-place finish at Madison and 13ths on both dirt tracks.

He and his sponsor returned to Fast Track and the No. 10 to run the 2019 season-opener at Daytona, which later turned into a full-season run for rookie of the year by April.

Because rookie Christian Eckes won the championship, he became ineligible to also win the rookie of the year award in addition to his title according to ARCA rules, so Vigh, who was second place behind Eckes in rookie points, was given the award at season's-end. He became the oldest rookie of the year winner in ARCA Series history, earning it at age 54.

Vigh did not return to the No. 10 full-time in 2020, and was replaced in that ride by Ryan Huff. However, he did go back to running part-time for Fast Track, with his first start of the season coming at Talladega. After initially being on the entry list in the team's No. 11 car, the team moved him to the No. 01 (which was to be driven by Dick Doheny) before the race due to Willie Mullins securing a ride with the team in the days leading up to the race, where he was put in the No. 11. Vigh finished nineteenth in both of his ARCA starts in 2020, his second coming at Pocono Raceway. He also made one start for Fast Track Racing in the ARCA Menards Series East at Dover.

Vigh stated prior to the 2020 season that he would be competing in dirt modified races at Orange County Fair Speedway as well as in street stock events again.

Personal life
Vigh is from Otisville, New York, although he currently lives in Parsippany, New Jersey. 

He and his wife Pamela Van Dunk own Big Momma Motorsports, which is Vigh's street stock and sportsman team.

In addition to racing, Vigh works as a shop fabricator for Statewide Line Striping and has been a longtime ambassador for his sponsor, Extreme Energy Solutions, based in Sparta, New Jersey.

Motorsports career results

ARCA Menards Series
(key) (Bold – Pole position awarded by qualifying time. Italics – Pole position earned by points standings or practice time. * – Most laps led.)

ARCA Menards Series East

 Season still in progress
 Driver ineligible for series points

References

External links
 
 

NASCAR drivers
ARCA Menards Series drivers
Racing drivers from New Jersey
1964 births
Living people
People from Parsippany-Troy Hills, New Jersey